Rajeev Motwani (Hindi: राजीव मोटवानी
, March 24, 1962 – June 5, 2009) was an Indian American professor of Computer Science at Stanford University whose research focused on theoretical computer science. He was a special advisor to Sequoia Capital. He was a winner of the Gödel Prize in 2001.

Education
Rajeev Motwani was born in Jammu,  Jammu and Kashmir, India on March 24, 1962, into a Sindhi Hindu family and grew up in New Delhi. His father was in the Indian Army. He had two brothers. As a child, inspired by luminaries like Gauss, he wanted to become a mathematician.
Motwani went to St Columba's School, New Delhi. He completed his B.Tech. in Computer Science from the Indian Institute of Technology Kanpur in Kanpur, Uttar Pradesh in 1983 and got his Ph.D. in Computer Science from the University of California, Berkeley in Berkeley, California, United States in 1988, under the supervision of Richard M. Karp.

Career
Motwani joined Stanford soon after U.C. Berkeley. 
He founded the Mining Data at Stanford project (MIDAS), an umbrella organization for several groups looking into new and innovative data management concepts. His research included data privacy, web search, robotics, and computational drug design.  He is also one of the originators of the Locality-sensitive hashing algorithm.

Motwani was one of the co-authors (with Larry Page and Sergey Brin, and Terry Winograd) of an influential early paper on the PageRank algorithm.  He also co-authored another seminal search paper What Can You Do With A Web In Your Pocket with those same authors.
PageRank was the basis for search techniques of Google (founded by Page and Brin), and Motwani advised or taught many of Google's developers and researchers, including the first employee, Craig Silverstein.

He was an author of two widely used theoretical computer science textbooks: Randomized Algorithms with Prabhakar Raghavan and Introduction to Automata Theory, Languages, and Computation with John Hopcroft and Jeffrey Ullman.

He was an avid angel investor and helped fund a number of startups to emerge from Stanford. He sat on boards including Google, Kaboodle,  Mimosa Systems (acquired by Iron Mountain Incorporated), Adchemy, Baynote, Vuclip, NeoPath Networks (acquired by Cisco Systems in 2007), Tapulous and Stanford Student Enterprises. He was active in the Business Association of Stanford Entrepreneurial Students (BASES).

He was a winner of the Gödel Prize in 2001 for his work on the PCP theorem and its applications to hardness of approximation.

He served on the editorial boards of SIAM Journal on Computing, Journal of Computer and System Sciences, ACM Transactions on Knowledge Discovery from Data, and IEEE Transactions on Knowledge and Data Engineering.

Death
Motwani was found dead in his pool in the backyard of his Atherton, San Mateo County, California home on June 5, 2009. The San Mateo County coroner, Robert Foucrault, ruled the death an accidental drowning. Toxicology tests showed that Motwani's blood alcohol content was 0.26 percent.
He could not swim, but was planning on taking lessons, according to his friends.

Personal life
Motwani, and his wife Asha Jadeja Motwani, had two daughters named Naitri and Anya.
After his death, his family donated US$1.5 million in 2011 and a building was named in his honor at IIT Kanpur.

Awards
 Gödel Prize in 2001
 Okawa Foundation Research Award
 Arthur Sloan Research Fellowship
 National Young Investigator Award from the National Science Foundation
 Distinguished Alumnus Award from IIT Kanpur in 2006
 Bergmann Memorial Award from the US-Israel Bi-National Science Foundation
 IBM Faculty Award

References

External links
 Mathematician at heart
 Professor Rajeev Motwani at The Telegraph

Indian emigrants to the United States
Stanford University School of Engineering faculty
Theoretical computer scientists
American computer scientists
Gödel Prize laureates
IIT Kanpur alumni
University of California, Berkeley alumni
Google people
1962 births
2009 deaths
American people of Sindhi descent
St. Columba's School, Delhi alumni
Sindhi people
Sindhi computer scientists
Scientists from Jammu and Kashmir
People from Jammu (city)
20th-century Indian mathematicians
People from Atherton, California
Indian computer scientists
Accidental deaths in California
Deaths by drowning in California